Gymnopilus nitens is a species of mushroom in the family Hymenogastraceae.

See also

List of Gymnopilus species

External links
Gymnopilus nitens at Index Fungorum

nitens
Fungi of North America